Mordellistena cairnsensis is a beetle in the genus Mordellistena of the family Mordellidae. It was first described in 1929 by Lea.

References

cairnsensis
Beetles described in 1929